Sassandra Department is a department of Gbôklé Region in Bas-Sassandra District, Ivory Coast. In 2021, its population was 353,228 and its seat is the settlement of Sassandra. The sub-prefectures of the department are Dakpadou, Grihiri, Lobakuya, Médon, Sago, and Sassandra.

History

Sassandra Department was created in 1969 as one of the 24 new departments that were created to take the place of the six departments that were being abolished. It was created by taking territory from both Centre-Ouest Department and Sud Department. Using current boundaries as a reference, from 1969 to 1980 the department occupied the same territory as Bas-Sassandra District, with the exception of Fresco Department (ie, all of Nawa, San-Pédro, and Gbôklé Regions save Fresco Department).

In 1980, Sassandra Department was divided to create Soubré Department. What remained was divided into three parts in 1988 in order to create San-Pédro and Tabou Departments.

In 1997, regions were introduced as new first-level subdivisions of Ivory Coast; as a result, all departments were converted into second-level subdivisions. Sassandra Department was included in Bas-Sassandra Region.

Sassandra Department was divided a third time in 2008 when Guéyo Department was created from it.

In 2011, districts were introduced as new first-level subdivisions of Ivory Coast. At the same time, regions were reorganised and became second-level subdivisions and all departments were converted into third-level subdivisions. At this time, Sassandra Department became part of Gbôklé Region in Bas-Sassandra District.

Maps of historical boundaries

In 2014, the population of the sub-prefecture of Sassandra was 72,221.

Villages
The villages of the sub-prefecture of Sassandra and their population in 2014 are:

Notes

Departments of Gbôklé
1969 establishments in Ivory Coast
States and territories established in 1969